Athletes from Kuwait competed in the 2010 Summer Youth Olympics in Singapore. However, Kuwaiti athletes competed under the Olympic flag as the Kuwait Olympic Committee had been suspended by the International Olympic Committee in January 2010 due to government interference.

Medallists

Athletics

Boys
Track and Road Events

Shooting

Rifle

Swimming

See also
 Athletes from Kuwait at the 2010 Asian Games
 Athletes from Kuwait at the 2010 Asian Para Games
 Athletes from Kuwait at the 2011 Asian Winter Games

References

External links
 Competitors List: Kuwait

Kuwait at the Youth Olympics
2010 in Kuwaiti sport